Sayyed Abol-Ghasem Mostafavi-Kashani ( Abu’l-Qāsem Kāšāni; 19 November 1882 – 13 March 1962) was an Iranian politician and Shia Marja.

Early life
His father, Ayatollah Hajj Seyyed Mostafavi Kashani, was a noted scholar of Islam in his time. Abol-Ghasem was trained in Shia Islam by his religious parents and began study of the Quran soon after learning to read and write.

At 16, Abol-Ghasem went to an Islamic seminary to study literature, Arabic language, logic, semantics and speech, as well as the principles of Islamic jurisprudence, or Fiqh. He continued his education at the seminary in an-Najaf in the Qur'an and Hadiths as interpreted in Sharia law, receiving his jurisprudence degree when he was 25.

Later life

Personal life 
Kashani had 3 wives and 26 children, including 12 sons.

His son Mostafa died in an accident in 1955; the newly appointed prime minister, Hossein Ala', escaped an assassination attempt at the funeral. According to British intelligence, around this time two of his sons were involved in a lucrative business buying and selling import-export licenses for restricted goods.

One of Kashani's children, Mahmoud Kashani, went on to become head of the Iranian delegation to the International Court of Justice in The Hague, Netherlands, in Iran's case with the United States and a presidential candidate in the Iranian presidential elections of 1985 and elections in 2005. His second son is Ahmad Kashani, a former member of the Iranian parliament.

Kashani is also the great-grandfather of Iranian-American filmmaker Sam Ali Kashani.

Political life and death
Abol-Ghasem expressed Anti-capitalist leanings from early on in his career and opposed what he saw as "oppression, despotism and colonization." Because of these beliefs, he was especially popular with the poor in Tehran. He also advocated the return of Islamic government to Iran, though this was most likely for political reasons.

Due to his pro-Nazi positions, Ayatollah Kashani was arrested and exiled by the British to Palestine in 1941. He continued to oppose foreign, especially British, control of Iran's oil industry while in exile. After he returned from exile on 10 June 1950, he continued to protest. Angered by the fact that the Anglo-Iranian Oil Company paid Iran much less than it did the British, he organized a movement against it and was the "virtually alone among the leading mujtahids in joining" nationalist Prime Minister Mohammed Mosaddeq, in his campaign to nationalize the Iranian oil industry in 1951.

Kashani served as speaker of the Majles (or lower house of Parliament), during the oil nationalization, but later turned against Mosaddeq during the 1953 Iranian coup d'état. Kashani protected the violent Islamist group Fada'iyan-e Islam, led by Navvab Safavi, after their expulsion from the Qom seminary by Ayatollah Hosein Borujerdi in 1950. The group then engaged in public assassinations in Tehran in the early 1950s. On 17 February 1956, a month after the execution of the Navvab Safavi due to his killing of senior figures Kashani confessed to an army prosecutor his role in these murders stating ""I issued the Fatwa to kill Razmara, for I was a qualified Mojtahed." Then Kashani was detained and following his release from the prison he retired from politics. He died on 13 March 1962.

References

Further reading
 

1882 births
1962 deaths
Iranian ayatollahs
National Front (Iran) MPs
Iranian elected officials who did not take office
Speakers of the National Consultative Assembly
Iranian politicians who have crossed the floor
Members of the 17th Iranian Majlis
Society of Muslim Warriors members
Pupils of Muhammad Kadhim Khorasani
20th-century Iranian politicians
Iranian exiles